Darrel Branhagen (born October 23, 1949) is the Iowa State Representative from the 55th District.  A Republican, he has served in the Iowa House of Representatives since 2015.

References

1949 births
Living people
People from Winneshiek County, Iowa
Drake University alumni
Iowa lawyers
Republican Party members of the Iowa House of Representatives
21st-century American politicians